Events in the year 2022 in Saint Vincent and the Grenadines.

Incumbents 

 Monarch: Elizabeth II (until 8 September); then Charles III 
 Governor General: Susan Dougan
 Prime Minister: Ralph Gonsalves

Events 
Ongoing — COVID-19 pandemic in Saint Vincent and the Grenadines

 8 September – Accession of Charles III as King of Saint Vincent and the Grenadines following the death of Queen Elizabeth II.
 19 September – Governor-General Dame Susan Dougan attends the state funeral of Queen Elizabeth II in the United Kingdom.

Deaths 

 21 August – Irvin Warrican, 56, Vincentian cricketer (Windward Islands) (born 1965)
 8 September – Elizabeth II, 96, Queen of Saint Vincent and the Grenadines (born 1926)

References 

 
2020s in Saint Vincent and the Grenadines
Years of the 21st century in Saint Vincent and the Grenadines
Saint Vincent and the Grenadines
Saint Vincent and the Grenadines